The Legend of Zu, also known as Zu Warriors, is a 2001 Hong Kong wuxia fantasy film produced and directed by Tsui Hark. The film starred Ekin Cheng, Cecilia Cheung, Louis Koo, Patrick Tam, Kelly Lin, Wu Jing, with special appearances by Sammo Hung and Zhang Ziyi. It is based on the same source as the 1983 film Zu: Warriors from the Magic Mountain.

Plot
Peacekeeping immortals living in clans inhabit a mythical mountain range called Zu, which is situated between Heaven and Earth. A demon called Insomnia desires to rule Zu and the world below, so it begins to destroy the various clans. In the Kunlun Mountains, Dawn sends away her apprentice, King Sky, because she believes that their emotional attachment to each other hinders their progress. She gives him her weapon, the Moon Orb, to help him train. He is to return only after he has attained a higher level. If she cannot be found, the Moon Orb will find her. Moments after they part, Insomnia attacks Dawn and disintegrates her.

200 years later, at Omei, Grandmaster White Brows senses darkness coming and despatches his student, Red, to investigate. King Sky joins Red and the Omei clan to fight Insomnia. White Brows engages and weakens Insomnia with his weapon, the Sky Reflector. Insomnia retreats into the legendary Blood Cave after its defeat with Omei's top warriors in pursuit. At the cave, King Sky notices Enigma, an Omei member who resembles Dawn. White Brows warns them that the cave is capable of draining the powers of those who venture near it. Red and King Sky risk their lives to battle Insomnia in the cave, and narrowly escape after White Brows sacrifices the Sky Reflector to save them. With Insomnia absorbing the cave's energy, White Brows orders Red to guard the cave entrance while the Omei members regroup and return to base.

White Brows tries to combine Enigma's Heaven Sword with Hollow's Thunder Sword, the two guardian weapons of Omei, to form a new weapon, the Flaming Sword of Thunder. Unfortunately, the fusion process fails and rebounds, causing Hollow to die and Enigma to be seriously injured. King Sky rescues Enigma. White Brows tells King Sky that Enigma is Dawn's reincarnation. He then appoints King Sky as the chief of Omei while he enters a new dimension to find a weapon to destroy Insomnia. Before leaving, he resurrects Hollow, who is renamed Ying, in the hope that the reborn Hollow can wield the Thunder Sword in their most desperate hour. However, when Ying turns out to be rather inept, King Sky tries to take his place and use the Thunder Sword himself, but fails and ends up being burnt to death. Enigma mourns his loss and buries his charred remains.

In the meantime, Red is possessed by Amnesia, a flower demon, while standing guard outside the Blood Cave. He returns to Omei, decimates the clan, and captures Enigma. Amnesia then destroys the rest of Omei. To the Omei survivors' frustration, Ying has yet to reawaken his past avatar and unlock his abilities. However, during a match against Thunder, an Omei swordsman, Ying suddenly recalls his past life and regains his powers. Concurrently, King Sky returns to life just in time to intercept and receive the new weapon found by White Brows. With the new weapon, King Sky joins Ying and the Omei survivors in confronting the possessed Red at the Blood Cave.

After Ying rescues Enigma, they return to Omei to stop Insomnia's final assault. King Sky exorcises Red, but the latter sacrifices himself to destroy Amnesia. At Omei, Enigma and Ying successfully fuse their swords to form a new weapon to defeat Insomnia. King Sky joins the duo and they weaken Insomnia. Enigma possesses Insomnia to prevent the demon from escaping, giving King Sky a chance to destroy it. Just as Insomnia is destroyed, Enigma remembers herself as Dawn and tells King Sky she is happy to find him again before disappearing. After the battle, Enigma is reincarnated as a new immortal and Mount Omei is restored. King Sky parts with the Omei to rebuild his clan.

Cast
 Ekin Cheng as King Sky
 Cecilia Cheung as Dawn / Enigma
 Louis Koo as Red
 Patrick Tam as Thunder
 Kelly Lin as Amnesia
 Wu Jing as Ying
 Sammo Hung as Grandmaster White Brows (special appearance)
 Zhang Ziyi as Joy (special appearance)
 Ng Kong as Hollow
 Lau Shun as Master Trascendential

Distribution
Although Miramax Films bought the rights to distribute it in the United States, the film was never released in theatres, despite advertising the American release with movie trailers (which appeared as previews on Apple's website under Movie Trailers). It was eventually released on DVD on 19 August 2005 under the title Zu Warriors.

Box office
The film grossed HK$10 million in its theatrical release in Hong Kong.

Critical reception
The Legend of Zu received mixed reviews from critics. Those who praised the film mostly noted its thrilling action scenes and elaborate, computer-generated sets.

The American release of the film was cut down extensively from 104 minutes to 80 minutes, with many plot and character development scenes being removed and most of the action scenes intact. This resulted in viewers finding the American version much harder to follow because of shallow characters and a plot so stripped of substance.

References

External links
 
 
 
 Michael Chung. The Essence of the Movie Legend of Zu Mountain.
 Legend of Zu, The Amazing Weapons

2000s Cantonese-language films
2000s Mandarin-language films
2001 films
Hong Kong fantasy films
2000s fantasy adventure films
China Star Entertainment Group films
Films directed by Tsui Hark
Films set in Sichuan
Wuxia films
2000s Hong Kong films